The elections for the eleventh Majlis were held during the spring and summer of 1937 and all deputies were elected to the parliament.

Like many other elections under the rule of Reza Shah, the election was "systematically controlled by the royal court". Well-known and important figures of ulama failed to win even a single seat in the elections.

References

Iran
1937 in Iran
National Consultative Assembly elections
Electoral fraud in Iran